The Leiman House is a historic home in Tampa, Florida. It is located at 716 South Newport Avenue. On September 9, 1974, it was added to the U.S. National Register of Historic Places. A "good example" of a fully developed Prairie style house, the building's architect was M. Leo Elliott. It has two stories, is of frame construction with a stucco exterior, and includes a hipped roof with eaves and front walls that enclose a raised patio. The home belonged to Henry Leiman (1857-1931), a manufacturer of cigar boxes.

References

Additional sources and external links
 Hillsborough County listings at National Register of Historic Places
 Hillsborough County listings at Florida's Office of Cultural and Historical Programs

Gallery

Prairie School architecture in Florida
Houses in Tampa, Florida
History of Tampa, Florida
Houses on the National Register of Historic Places in Hillsborough County, Florida